The Miss Paraguay 2005 pageant was held in Asunción, Paraguay. The pageant was won by Karina Buttner of Asunción, who was crowned by outgoing queen Yanina Alicia González Jorgge. The pageant was broadcast live on Telefuturo from the Yacht & Golf Club Paraguayo.

Results

Delegates

Background Music
Los Nocheros

See also
Miss Paraguay
Paraguay at major beauty pageants

External links

2005
2005 beauty pageants
2005 in Paraguay
March 2005 events in South America